Barbus sp. 'Nzoia 2' is an undescribed but distinct ray-finned fish species in the family Cyprinidae. It was first reported in 1999. A small African barb, it is provisionally assigned to the genus Barbus, but probably belongs – like similar species – in another genus.

It is apparently endemic to Kenya. The only places where it has been found to date are in the Nzoia River drainage basin of the Lake Victoria region; it might occur elsewhere though. It may be a threatened species, but too little is known about its distribution, population size and taxonomy to judge its status with a higher level of certainty. Therefore, it is classified as Data Deficient by the IUCN, but this will change when this fish becomes better known.

See also
Other undescribed small barbs from Kenya:
 Barbus sp. 'Baringo'
 Barbus sp. 'Nzoia'
 Barbus sp. 'Pangani'

Footnotes

References
 

?
Endemic freshwater fish of Kenya
Undescribed vertebrate species
Taxonomy articles created by Polbot